The 2021 GT World Challenge Europe Endurance Cup was the eleventh season of the GT World Challenge Europe Endurance Cup. It saw the series return to a five-event schedule following a shortened 2020 programme.

Calendar 
The season began on 16 April at Autodromo Nazionale Monza, and ended on 10 October at Circuit de Barcelona-Catalunya. It lasted five rounds.

Entry List

Race results
Bold indicates the overall winner.

Championship standings

Scoring system
Championship points are awarded for the first ten positions in each race. The pole-sitter also receives one point and entries are required to complete 75% of the winning car's race distance in order to be classified and earn points. Individual drivers are required to participate for a minimum of 25 minutes in order to earn championship points in any race.

Monza & Barcelona points

Paul Ricard & Nürburgring points

24 Hours of Spa points
Points are awarded after six hours, after twelve hours and at the finish.

Drivers' Championship

Overall

Silver Cup

Pro/Am Cup

Team's Championship

Overall

Silver Cup

Pro/Am Cup

See also 

 2021 GT World Challenge Europe
 2021 GT World Challenge Europe Sprint Cup
 2021 GT World Challenge Asia
 2021 GT World Challenge America
 2021 GT World Challenge Australia

Notes

References

External links

GT World Challenge Europe Endurance Cup
GT World Challenge Europe Endurance Cup